is a railway station on the Kagoshima Main Line operated by JR Kyushu in Arao, Kumamoto Prefecture, Japan.

Lines 
Both local and rapid services on the line stop at the station.

Layout 
The station consists of two side platforms serving two tracks. The station building is a simple steel and glass structure which is unstaffed and serves only to house a waiting room, an automatic ticket vending machine and a Sugoca card reader. Access to the opposite side platform is by means of a footbridge.

Adjacent stations

Layout 
The station consists of two side platforms serving two tracks.

History
Japanese National Railways (JGR) opened the station on 1 May 1950 as an additional station on the existing track of the Kagoshima Main Line. With the privatization of JNR on 1 April 1987, JR Kyushu took over control of the station.

Passenger statistics
In fiscal 2016, the station was used by an average of 407 passengers daily (boarding passengers only), and it ranked 266th among the busiest stations of JR Kyushu.

References

External links
Minami-Arao Station (JR Kyushu)

Railway stations in Kumamoto Prefecture
Railway stations in Japan opened in 1950